Dhu al-Kifl (literally "Possessor of the Portion; also spelled Dhu l-Kifl,  Dhul-Kifl, Zu al-Kifl, or Zu l-Kifl) is an Islamic prophet. Although his identity is unknown, his identity has been theorised and identified as various Hebrew Bible prophets and other figures, most commonly Ezekiel. Dhu al-Kifl is believed to have been exalted by Allah to a high station in life and is chronicled in the Quran as a man of the "Company of the Good". Although not much is known of Dhu al-Kifl from other historical sources, all the writings from classical commentators, such as Ibn Ishaq and Ibn Kathir, speak of Dhu al-Kifl as a prophetic, saintly man who remained faithful in daily prayer and worship. 

A tomb in the Ergani province of Diyarbakir, Turkey is believed by some to be the resting place of prophet Dhu al-Kifl. It is located 5 km from the city centre on a hill called Makam Dağı.

Etymology 
Such names were used of other notable figures in the Quran, for example Dhu al-Qarnayn, and Dhu al-Nūn, referring to Yunus. Kifl is an archaic Arabic word meaning "double" or "duplicate", from a root meaning "to double" or "to fold"; it was also used for a fold of cloth. The name is generally understood to mean "one of a double portion". Some scholars have suggested that the name means "the man with the double recompense" or rather "the man who received recompense twice over", that is to say that it is a title for Job, as his family was returned to him according to the Quran and the Book of Job.

According to one view, it means "the man of Kifl", as "the one of..." is another possible translation of the participle dhū, and Kifl is allegedly the Arabic rendition of "Kapilavastu".

In the Quran
Dhu al-Kifl has been mentioned twice in the Quran, in the following verses:

In both cases, Dhu al-Kifl is mentioned in the context of a list of Qur'anic prophets, including many others not mentioned in the ayat quoted above.

Identifications

Ezekiel
Some are of the opinion that Dhu al-Kifl could be Ezekiel. When the exile, monarchy, and state were annihilated, a political and national life was no longer possible.  In conformity with the two parts of his book, his personality and his preaching are alike twofold, and the title Dhu al-Kifl means "the one to double" or "to fold".

Abdullah Yusuf Ali, in his Quranic commentary says:

Al Kifl (Arabic: الكفل; ul-Kifl) is a town in southeastern Iraq on the Euphrates River, between Najaf and Al Hillah. Variant names for the shrine within Al Kifl are: Dhu'l Kifl Shrine, Marqad Dhu'l Kifl, Qubbat Dhu'l Kifl, Qabr al-Nabi Dhu al-Kifl, Dhu al-Kifl Shrine, Zul Kifl Shrine, Qabr Hazqiyal, Hazqiyal Shrine. Hazqiyal is the Arabic transliteration of the Hebrew Y'hezqel, which was mostly utilized by Sephardi Jews after they adopted Arabic. This indicates that the Jews equated Ezekiel and Dhu al-Kifl, and Muslim exegetes followed suit. The Iraqi authorities assert that in 1316 (715–16 AH) the Ilkhanid Sultan Uljaitu acquired the rights of guardianship over the tomb from the Jewish community. Consequently, the shrine was renamed according to the Islamic nomenclature for the same prophet. Sultan Uljaitu added to the structure by building a mosque and a minaret. As well he restored the shrine implementing some alterations made clear by comparing its present state with pre-Ilkhanid travelers' descriptions. The site remained a Muslim pilgrimage place until the beginning of the nineteenth century when Menahim Ibn Danyal, a wealthy Jew, successfully converted it back to a Jewish site and restored it. The minaret remained as the only witness to its tenure as an Islamic site. Although the mosque and minaret were built in the 14th-century, the antiquity of the shrine and grave cannot be determined.

Others
Dhu al-Kifl has also been identified variously with Joshua, Obadiah and Isaiah.

See also
Biblical narratives and the Quran
Legends and the Quran
Prophets and messengers in Islam
Stories of the Prophets
Al Kifl

References

Further reading

 Thalabi, Ara'is al-Madjalis, Cairo edition 1371, 155
 J. Horovitz, Koranische Untersuchungen, 113
 Harawi, K. al-isharat ila ma'rifat al-Ziyarat, ed. J. Sourdel-Thomine, 76
 Guide des lieux de Pelerinage'', tans. J. Sourdel-Thomine, 76, Damascus 1957, 174

External links 
Story of Dhul-Kifl (Ezekiel)
Ezekiel (Hizqeel)
Dhu'l Kifl Shrine

Prophets of the Quran